Yaremis Pérez (born 24 March 1981) is a Cuban archer. She competed in the women's individual event at the 2000 Summer Olympics.

References

1981 births
Living people
Cuban female archers
Olympic archers of Cuba
Archers at the 2000 Summer Olympics
Place of birth missing (living people)
Pan American Games medalists in archery
Pan American Games gold medalists for Cuba
Archers at the 1999 Pan American Games
Medalists at the 1999 Pan American Games
20th-century Cuban women